Dariusz Kołodziej (born April 17, 1982 in Kraków) is a Polish retired football player.

References

External links
 

1982 births
Living people
Polish footballers
Górnik Zabrze players
Hutnik Nowa Huta players
Podbeskidzie Bielsko-Biała players
Ekstraklasa players
Footballers from Kraków
Association football midfielders